Girlguiding Anglia is one of the nine Countries and Regions of Girlguiding UK. It is further subdivided into twelve Girlguiding Counties. These are not the same as the counties defined by the British government.

Counties
Girlguiding Anglia is subdivided into twelve counties. These are:
 Bedfordshire
 Buckinghamshire
 Cambridgeshire West
 Cambridgeshire East
 Essex North East
 Essex South East
 Essex West
 Hertfordshire
 Lincolnshire South
 Norfolk
 Oxfordshire
 Suffolk

Campsites and Activity Centres

Hautbois Residential and Activity Centre

Hautbois is the Residential and Activity Centre owned by Girlguiding Anglia. The Region's office are located on the estate. It is located on the outskirts of Coltishall, near the city of Norwich.

Hautbois was built in the 19th century. It has been owned by Girlguiding Anglia since 1984 and has been a Residential and Activity Centre since 1988. It has had links with Guiding since the early part of the 20th century. Its previous owners, Beth and Phillipa Patteson were committed Guides from childhood and the property had often been used for Guiding activities.

References

Bibliography

External links
 Girlguiding Anglia

Girlguiding